Page County Courthouse is a historic courthouse building located at Luray, Page County, Virginia. It was built in 1832–1833, and consists of a two-story, four-bay court house with three-bay, one-story wings. The four-bays of the pedimented gable facade open onto a ground floor arcade with rounded arches in the Jeffersonian Roman Revival style. It is topped by a cupola with coupled pilasters and four pedimented gables. It was built by Malcolm Crawford and William B. Philips, who worked under Thomas Jefferson on the University of Virginia.

It was listed on the National Register of Historic Places in 1973. It is a contributing property in the Luray Downtown Historic District.

References

Courthouses on the National Register of Historic Places in Virginia
County courthouses in Virginia
Government buildings completed in 1833
Buildings and structures in Page County, Virginia
National Register of Historic Places in Page County, Virginia
Jeffersonian Revival architecture
Individually listed contributing properties to historic districts on the National Register in Virginia